European Film Award for Best Short Film has been awarded annually since 1998 by the European Film Academy.

Winners and nominees

1990s

2000s

2010s

2020s

Most wins for Best Short film by country

References

External links
 Nominees and winners at the European Film Academy website

Prix UIP
Short film awards